Chow Chow Momo na Haobara Shingju Bora na oinambara (English: Is Chow Chow Momo Tasty Or Shingju Bora Delicious) is a 2013 Indian Meitei language film directed by R.K. Jiten and produced by L. Dayabati, under the banner of Leishangthem Films and presented by Mixn Raj. The film features Gurumayum Bonny, Bala Hijam and Sushmita Mangsatabam in the lead roles. The film was also showcased in Punjab on 13 October 2013. Chow Chow Momo na haobara Shingju Borana Oinambara  was released at Manipur Film Development Corporation, Palace Compound on 27 October 2013. There were also theatrical releases of the film at Pratap Talkies, Paona Bazar, and many other theatres of Manipur in December 2013.

About
The film sketches the romance between Mani and Nungshitombi and also shows the consequences met by Manglembi due to cyber crime. Gurumayum Bonny plays double role in the film.

Cast
 Gurumayum Bonny as Mani
 Bala Hijam as Nungshitombi
 Sushmita Mangsatabam as Manglembi
 Ratan Lai
 Takhellambam Lokendra as Manglembi's father
 R.K. Hemabati as Manglembi's mother
 Samjetsabam Mangoljao
 Heisnam Geeta
 Ayekpam Shanti

Soundtrack

R.K. Jiten composed the soundtrack for the film and Prane and Akendra Tensuba wrote the lyrics. The songs are titled Leiraroidara Khallui, Pamdi Pamba Tin Yotpa and Ningthou Machasu Kallakte.

References

External links
 

2010s Meitei-language films
2013 films